The Rainbow Books are a collection of CD format specifications generally written and published by standards bodies including the ISO, IEC, and ECMA.

Red Book (1980) 

CD-DA (Digital Audio) – standardized as IEC 60908
CD-Text—a 1996 extension to CD-DA
CD-MIDI—part of the original red-book standard
CD+G (plus Graphics) – karaoke
CD+EG / CD+XG (plus Extended Graphics) – an extension of CD+G

Yellow Book (1983) 

CD-ROM (Read-Only Memory) – standardized as ISO/IEC 10149 in 1988 and ECMA-130 in 1989
CD-ROM XA (eXtended Architecture) – a 1991 extension of CD-ROM

Green Book (1986) 

CD-i (Interactive)

Orange Book (1990) 

Orange is a reference to the fact that red and yellow mix to orange. This correlates with the fact that CD-R and CD-RW are capable of audio ("Red") and data ("Yellow"); although other colors (other CD standards) that do not mix are capable of being burned onto the physical medium. Orange Book also introduced the standard for multisession writing.
CD-MO (Magneto-Optical)
CD-R (Recordable) alias CD-WO (Write Once) alias CD-WORM (Write Once, Read Many) – partially standardized as ECMA-394
CD-RW (ReWritable) alias CD-E (Eraseable) – partially standardized as ECMA-395

Beige Book (1992) 

PCD (Photo)

White Book (1993) 

CD-i Bridge - a bridge format between CD-ROM XA and the Green Book CD-i, which is the base format for Video CDs, Super Video CDs and Photo CDs.
VCD (Video)
SVCD (Super Video, 1998) – a 1998 extension of VCD, standardized as IEC 62107 in 2000.

Blue Book (1995)  

E-CD/CD+/CD Extra (Enhanced)

Scarlet Book (1999) 
Scarlet color of this book is a reference to the Red Book, which defines original CDDA.

SACD (Super Audio)

Purple Book (2000) 

DDCD (Double Density)

See also
 ISO 9660, a 1986 filesystem standard used in conjunction with CD-ROM formats.
 Orange-Book-Standard, a decision named after the Compact Disc standard, issued in 2009 by the German Federal Court of Justice on the interaction between patent law and standards

References

External links
Philips CD Specifications

 
Japanese inventions
Compact disc